Leslie Hamilton Johnston (16 August 1920 – 19 October 2001) was a Scottish footballer who played for Clydebank Juniors, Clyde, Hibernian, Celtic, Stoke City, Shrewsbury Town and the Scotland national team.

Club career
Johnston was born in Glasgow and moved to Clyde from Clydebank Juniors in December 1941 before joining Hibernian in February 1947 for £10,000, a then Scottish football transfer record. However, he rejoined Clyde just eight months later for the same transfer fee. He joined Celtic the following year for £12,000, another Scottish transfer record. He remained with Celtic for just one year, before moving to English club Stoke City for £9,000. He struggled in his first season at the Victoria Ground scoring just five goals in 1949–50. He improved in 1950–51 scoring 13 goals but again struggled to find his form and missed a lot a games due to injury. He was released in May 1953 and he went play for Shrewsbury Town.

International career
During his second spell at Clyde, Johnston earned two caps for Scotland. He scored in the second of his caps, a 2–1 defeat to Switzerland in May 1948. He had also played for Scotland in one wartime International.

Career statistics

Club
Source:

International
Source:

Honours
 Clyde
 Glasgow Cup: 1946–47

References

External links
 
 

1920 births
2001 deaths
Celtic F.C. players
Clyde F.C. players
Hibernian F.C. players
Footballers from Glasgow
Scotland international footballers
Scottish Football League players
Scottish footballers
Shrewsbury Town F.C. players
Stoke City F.C. players
English Football League players
Clydebank Juniors F.C. players
Association football inside forwards
Scotland wartime international footballers
Scottish Junior Football Association players